Munsubong (문수봉; 	文殊峰) is the name of two mountains in South Korea:

 Munsubong (Jecheon, Chungcheongbuk-do/Mungyeong, Gyeongsangbuk-do)
 Munsubong (Taebaek, Gangwon-do/Bonghwa, Gyeongsangbuk-do)

See also 
 Munsusan (disambiguation)